Guilherme 'Gui' Carvalho Dos Santos is a Brazilian basketball player.

Club career
In 2018, he played for Minas U21 team where he averaged 6.7 points, 5.7 rebounds, 2.5 assists, 10.5 efficiency and 23.0 minutes on the court - at only 16 years of age. 

In the 2018–19 NBB season, because he was still in school and for several other reasons, he was unable to fully follow the adult team's routine.  

In the 2019 Basketball Development League (LDB), Gui was the leader of the Minas team. At 17, his averages were 14.5 points, 6.4 rebounds and 2.6 assists in the U-20 championship.

In 2019, Gui Carvalho was already part of his club's senior cast. He entered the court in three Minas games in the 2018–19 NBB season – against Joinville, Vasco and Sesi Franca.

In the 2019–20 NBB season, Minas' coach Léo Costa granted Carvalho a bigger role with the team.

National team
He was one of the main players in the Brazilian team that won the 2019 U-17 South American Championship.

In February 2020, Gui Santos was called up by Aleksandar Petrovic for the Brazilian senior national team. He scored 11 points in the two games against Uruguay at the 2021 Copa America qualifiers.

Miscellaneous
Gui Carvalho was one of the Brazilian representatives at Basketball Without Borders, a camp held by FIBA and the NBA that brought together 64 prospects from Latin America for training sessions in the city of Medellín (Colombia), and also at the FIBA Americas Youth Elite Camp, that happened in Campinas, Brazil at the end of 2018.

According to the Brazilian news site O TEMPO, Carvalho is the Darling of the Crowd (um xodó da torcida).

Gui recalls that especially the support of Minas teammates Alex Garcia and Leandro Barbosa helped him shape his game and reach success.

References

External links
FIBA Profile 
Champions League Profile
Profile at Latinbasket.com

2002 births
Living people
Brazilian men's basketball players
Small forwards
Sportspeople from Brasília